Zsuzsanna Vörös (born 4 May 1977 in Székesfehérvár) is a retired Hungarian modern pentathlete who won a gold medal at the 2004 Summer Olympics in Athens, Greece. Her score of 5448 is broken down as follows:

 Shooting—1120
 Fencing—916
 Swimming—1296
 Riding—1124
 Running—992

She won gold medals for the individual event at the World Modern Pentathlon Championships in 1999, 2003 and 2004, with scores of 5319, 5604 and 5624 respectively.

Awards and recognition
 Knight's Cross of the Order of Merit of the Republic of Hungary: 2004
 Honorary Citizen of Székesfehérvár: 2004
 SportStars Award: 2004
 Hungarian Sportswoman of The Year: 2005

References

External links
 
 

1977 births
Living people
Hungarian female modern pentathletes
Knight's Crosses of the Order of Merit of the Republic of Hungary (civil)
Modern pentathletes at the 2000 Summer Olympics
Modern pentathletes at the 2004 Summer Olympics
Modern pentathletes at the 2008 Summer Olympics
Olympic gold medalists for Hungary
Olympic medalists in modern pentathlon
Olympic modern pentathletes of Hungary
Sportspeople from Székesfehérvár
Medalists at the 2004 Summer Olympics
World Modern Pentathlon Championships medalists